Friday is a stoner comedy film franchise created by Ice Cube and DJ Pooh. The series takes place in South Central Los Angeles and follows the exploits of perpetually unemployed Craig Jones, who along with his friends and relatives, are thrust into various issues that happen to occur on a Friday.

Three films have been released. The first film, Friday (1995), was a sleeper hit and has garnered a large cult following. The film's success led to two sequels, Next Friday (2000) and Friday After Next (2002), which were also box office successes. A short-lived animated series based on the films debuted in 2007 on MTV2 and lasted 8 episodes.

Films

Friday (1995)

The film takes a look at one single Friday in the life of two friends, Craig Jones (Ice Cube) and Smokey (Chris Tucker), in South Central LA. Craig has recently been fired from his job while attempting to collect his wages, as he was allegedly caught on camera stealing cardboard boxes from UPS, although he claims innocence. Throughout the day, friends and local neighborhood characters pass through, including the hulking neighborhood bully Deebo (Tommy Lister Jr.) and interactions with Craig's father Willie (John Witherspoon), his mother Betty (Anna Maria Horsford), and sister Dana (Regina King). The film's subplot focuses on drug dealer Big Worm (Faizon Love), who warns Craig and Smokey to collect $200 worth of marijuana they smoked (which was supposed to be sold) no later than 10:00 that evening, or Craig and Smokey will be killed.

In the end, Craig manages to overcome all of the day's tribulations, save for finding employment; he and Smokey are able to pay Big Worm, he confronts Deebo and successfully beats him after all of his bullying to everyone else, and he and his pretty neighbor Debbie (Nia Long) hook up.

Next Friday (2000)

Next Friday is a 2000 stoner comedy film, and the sequel to the 1995 film Friday. This is the first film to be produced by Ice Cube's film production company Cube Vision. The film is directed by Steve Carr, and stars Ice Cube, Mike Epps, Don Curry, John Witherspoon, and Tommy "Tiny" Lister Jr.

In the sequel, Deebo has sworn revenge against Craig for beating him up and putting him in jail for a week. He is joined by his little brother Tyrone (Sticky Fingaz) whom he escaped jail with. Craig's father, Willie decides to send him up to Rancho Cucamonga and live with his uncle's family until Deebo is back in jail. It's there, he learns about the financial problems that Day-Day (Mike Epps) and his father, Elroy (Don Curry), face. He is also informed by their Korean neighbor, Mrs. Ho-Kim (Amy Hill) with the problems of Karla's older brothers: Joker (Jacob Vargas), Lil' Joker (Lobo Sebastian) and Baby Joker (Rolando Molina). When Craig learns about the drug money hidden in a pipe kept in Joker's room, Craig conspires with Day-Day and Roach to steal it so they can use the money to pay off the debts.

Friday After Next (2002)

One year has passed since the events of the last film. At 3:37 AM on Christmas Eve, Craig and Day-Day are robbed by a fake Santa Claus (Rickey Smiley) as he stole their presents, Craig's CD collection, Day-Day's baby pictures and a big sandwich. Craig and Day-Day get jobs as rent-a-cops in a strip mall where Willie and Elroy opened up a rib joint, called "Bros. BBQ". They owe rent to their apartment landlady Ms. Pearly (BeBe Drake) who threatens the two with the attentions of her burly gay ex-con son Damon Pearly (Terry Crews). Craig is in love with Donna (K.D. Aubert), the girlfriend of a pimp named Money Mike (Katt Williams) who treats her poorly. Craig and Day-Day throw a rent party to get the money for Ms. Pearly while also subduing the fake Santa Claus.

Last Friday (TBA) 

According to John Witherspoon, the fourth installment of the series has been greenlit as of April 2017. DJ Pooh reveals in an interview on Drink Champs that he's working on Last Friday with Ice Cube. As of April 2018, Ice Cube stated "Right now we're still writing the movie, making sure that's ahead of the curve and not behind the curve. But I believe we'll start shooting, hopefully by the end of this year." In May 2018, Mike Epps posted a video and image on Instagram with Ice Cube, teasing fans, and they assumed that the film is in production. However, the footage was for the Friday film inspired Big 3 season 2 commercial, and it teased what Last Friday would look like.

On April 29, 2019, Ice Cube stated that the script has been completed, and hopes for it to be released on the 25th anniversary of the original film, which was in 2020. "We are pushing for it, we finished the script, we are getting notes from the studio and it's going back and forth," Cube said. "Get into pre-production and start hiring. It would be nice for this to come out on the 25th anniversary." On June 21, 2019, Ice Cube stated that the movie is coming and he's currently doing a rewrite with DJ Pooh. Four months later, on October 29, 2019, John Witherspoon died, which leaves the fate of his character unknown. On November 14, 2019, Ice Cube blamed New Line Cinema for not committing to getting the film made while Witherspoon was alive. Ever since Witherspoon's death, Ice Cube stated that the film was currently on hold although he hopes to get it back on track in the near future.

On December 19, 2020, in the wake of Tommy Lister Jr.'s death, Angela Means claimed on a podcast that the project was cancelled. Similar to Ice Cube, she too blamed New Line Cinema for not devoting themselves to the film's production stating "You let our legends die". A day later, on December 20, Clifton Powell expressed hope that the film would still be in production and that it will include a tribute to John Witherspoon and Tommy Lister Jr.

On May 7, 2021, Ice Cube opened up about two potential scripts he had written for the film. The first one would have focused on Craig and Day-Day trying to survive in prison after having their Cannabis Dispensary stolen by a Flash mob. They both would have then found themselves in a Rehabilitation hospital run by Smokey. Cube did not give any precise details on the second script, although, he stated it would have focused around a love story.

On October 1, 2022, in an episode with Drink Champs, Ice Cube revealed Warner Bros., who owns the distribution rights of the film series, had rejected the scripts, citing creative differences, and while Tucker previously stated he is not committed to return for the film, Ice Cube is still in good relations with Tucker, with the latter to his reprise his role as Smokey uncertain.

Television

Friday: The Animated Series (2007)

An animated series titled Friday: The Animated Series aired on MTV2 in 2007.

Just like the original films setting, the series takes place in a modern South Central Los Angeles and follows the life of Craig Jones, his family, his best friend Smokey and the dilemmas they come across while living in a run-down, crime-ridden neighborhood. Most of the characters from the films are in the series, but they are not voiced by their respective actors. However, they are voiced by veteran voice actors. Ice Cube, who played Craig Jones in the films, served as the series' executive producer. Khary Payton served as Jones' voice actor.

Image Entertainment released the complete series on DVD in Region 1 on December 8, 2009.

Voice cast
 Khary Payton as Craig Jones
 Phil LaMarr as Smokey, Stanley, Joann, Pinky, Money Mike, Uncle Elroy Jones, Additional Voices
 John DiMaggio as Willie "Pops" Jones, Mayor, Additional Voices
 Cree Summer as Betty "Mom" Jones, Dana Jones, Infant Craig, Additional Voices
 Masasa Moyo as Big Mary
 Beth Payne
 Kevin Michael Richardson as Deebo, Additional voices
 Reno Wilson as Ezal
 Chris Edgerly

Episodes

Cast and characters

Crew

References

 
Film series introduced in 1995
American film series
Comedy film franchises
New Line Cinema franchises